The 1702 English general election was the first to be held during the reign of Queen Anne, and was necessitated by the demise of William III. The new government dominated by the Tories gained ground in the election, with the Tory party winning a substantial majority over the Whigs, owing to the popularity of the new monarch and a burst of patriotism following the coronation. Despite this, the government found the new Parliament difficult to manage, as its leading figures Godolphin and Marlborough were not sympathetic to the more extreme Tories. Contests occurred in 89 constituencies in England and Wales.

Summary of the constituencies
See 1796 British general election for details. The constituencies used in England and Wales were the same throughout the period. In 1707 alone the 45 Scottish members were not elected from the constituencies, but were returned by co-option of a part of the membership of the last Parliament of Scotland elected before the Union.

Party strengths are an approximation, with many MPs' allegiances being unknown.

See also
 1st Parliament of Queen Anne
 List of parliaments of England
 Government of the United Kingdom
 Elections in the United Kingdom

References

External links
 History of Parliament: Members 1690–1715
 History of Parliament: Constituencies 1690–1715

1702
General election
18th-century elections in Europe
1702 in politics